Jenny Tranfield (born 31 March 1975 in Sheffield) is a professional squash player who represented England as a junior. She reached a career-high world ranking of World No. 8 in January 2005.

References

External links 

English female squash players
Living people
1975 births
Competitors at the 2005 World Games